
Futbol Club Barcelona is a football club based in Barcelona, Catalonia, Spain that competes in La Liga, the most senior football league in Spain. Since its founding in 1899, the club has had 41 different presidents. The club is owned by the club-members of FC Barcelona, and similarly to a limited liability company, they elect the president by a ballot. The president has the responsibility for the overall management of the club, including formally signing contracts with players and staff. In Spain, it is customary for the president to watch the games in which the first-team participates, together with the president from the opposing team.

History 

On 22 October 1899, Swiss sportsman Joan Gamper placed an advertisement in the Los Deportes newspaper declaring his wish to form a football club in the city. A positive response resulted in a meeting at the Gimnasio Solé on 29 November which eleven men attended, including Walter Wild, later to become the first president of the club, and Bartomeu Terradas, who became the second president. As a result of this meeting FC Barcelona was formed.

In 1908, Gamper became club president for the first time, taking over the presidency to save the club from extinction. The club had not won anything since the Campionat de Catalunya in 1905, and as a result was experiencing severe financial difficulties. Gamper was subsequently club president on five separate occasions between 1908 and 1925 and spent 26 years with the club.  One of his main achievements was to help Barça acquire its own stadium and thus a way of generating stable income.  An annual pre-season competition, the Joan Gamper Trophy, has been held in his honour since 1966.

The team won six Campionat de Catalunya titles between 1930 and 1938, but success at national level (with the exception of the 1937 disputed title) evaded them. From the formation of La Liga until 1978, Barcelona had 20 different presidents, meaning each presidential period lasted on average two-and-a-half years. In 1978 Josep Lluís Núñez became the first elected president of FC Barcelona, and ever since members of the club have elected the club president. The process of electing a president of FC Barcelona was closely tied to Spain's transition to democracy in 1974 and the end of Franco's dictatorship. Núñez's main objective was to develop Barça into a world-class club by giving it stability both on and off the pitch. His presidency lasted for 22 years, making him the longest-serving president. 

After the departure of Núñez in 2000, his vice-president through 22 years, Joan Gaspart took over the club. During his presidency of the club, the team won no trophies and, after two-and-a-half years Gaspart resigned his position on 12 February 2003 when the team lay in 15th place, two points above relegation. Enric Reyna was elected as temporary president until the board resigned on 5 May 2003. Hereafter an interim commission presided until the general elections were held. On 15 June 2003 Joan Laporta entered office and was the most successful president in terms of Champions league trophies. The club won the Champions League twice within three years and completed an "unprecedented sextuple" by winning the 2008–09 La Liga, 2008–09 Copa del Rey, 2009 Supercopa de España, 2008–09 UEFA Champions League, 2009 UEFA Super Cup and 2009 FIFA Club World Cup.

On 13 June 2010, Sandro Rosell was elected president of FC Barcelona with more than 60% of the vote of Barça's club members, and he formally took over the presidency on 1 July 2010. He resigned in 2014 as a result of a scandal involving the signing of Neymar. 

Josep Maria Bartomeu replaced Rosell on January 23, 2014, before resigning in October 2020. A management commission lead by Carles Tusquets took over until Joan Laporta was elected for a second time on 7 March 2021 with over 54% of the vote.

List of presidents 

Below is the official presidential history of FC Barcelona, from when Walter Wild took over at the club in 1899, until the present day.

Notes

References

External links 

 
Presidents